Herpt is a village in the Dutch province of North Brabant. It is located in the municipality of Heusden, about 1 km southeast of the center of the city.

History 
The village was first mentioned between 1108 and 1121 Harpede. The etymology is unclear.

The Dutch Reformed church dated from the 15th century, but was destroyed on 5 November 1944 by the Germans and not rebuilt. The Catholic church dates from 1924.

Herpt was home to 380 people in 1840. Herpt was a separate municipality until 1935 (sometimes called Herpt en Bern or Herpt c.a.), when it became a part of Heusden.

Gallery

References

Populated places in North Brabant
Former municipalities of North Brabant
Heusden